Steve Pederson is an athletic director.

Steve Pederson or Pedersen may also refer to:

Steve Pederson (sound engineer)
Steve Pedersen, guitarist

See also
Steve Peterson (disambiguation)